Macroperipatus valerioi is a species of velvet worm in the Peripatidae family. Females of this species have 34 pairs of legs. The type locality is in Costa Rica.

References

Onychophorans of tropical America
Onychophoran species
Animals described in 1986